Dalma may refer to:

Music 

Via Dalma, an album by Sergio Dalma
 Via Dalma II, an album by Sergio Dalma

People 
 Dalma (name)

Places

Armenia 

 Dalma Garden Mall in Yerevan

Australia 
 Dalma, Queensland, a locality in the Rockhampton Region

India 

Dalma Hills, a hill range located near the industrial city of Jamshedpur in Jharkhand, eastern India
 Dalma Wildlife Sanctuary in eastern India

United Arab Emirates 
 Dalma (island), an island off the coast of Abu Dhabi
 Dalma Airport
 Dalma Mall in Abu Dhabi

Other 
 Dalma (dish), a dish from Odia cuisine

See also
 Dâlma (disambiguation)